Philip Yorke may refer to:

 Philip Yorke, 1st Earl of Hardwicke (1690–1764), English lawyer and politician
 Philip Yorke, 2nd Earl of Hardwicke (1720–1790), English politician
 Philip Yorke, 3rd Earl of Hardwicke (1757–1834), English politician
 Philip Yorke, Viscount Royston (1784–1808), English politician, eldest son of Philip Yorke, 3rd Earl of Hardwicke
 Philip Yorke (antiquary) (1743–1804), English scholar of Welsh history and genealogy 
 Philip James Yorke (1799–1874), British Army officer, scientist and Fellow of the Royal Society
 Philip Scott Yorke (1905–1978), last Squire of Erddig